Stanley Weston (16 May 1923 – 19 January 2000) was a British basketball player. He competed in the men's tournament at the 1948 Summer Olympics. His brother, Harry, also competed in the same tournament.

References

1923 births
2000 deaths
British men's basketball players
Olympic basketball players of Great Britain
Basketball players at the 1948 Summer Olympics
People from Kings Norton
Sportspeople from Birmingham, West Midlands